Stuart Frank Delery (born 1968) is an American attorney who is currently serving as the White House Counsel, as of July 2022, succeeding Dana Remus.  Previously, Delery had served as Deputy Counsel to the President in the Biden administration,  announced in December 2020. Prior to that, he was the Acting United States Associate Attorney General from 2014 to 2016.

Education 
Delery earned a Bachelor of Arts degree from the University of Virginia in 1990 and a Juris Doctor from Yale Law School in 1993. He served as a law clerk for justices Sandra Day O'Connor and Byron White, in addition to Gerald Bard Tjoflat of the United States Court of Appeals for the Eleventh Circuit.

Career 
Delery joined the United States Department of Justice in 2009 as the chief of staff and counselor to the United States Deputy Attorney General. He later served as a senior counselor to the United States Attorney General. From March 2012 to September 2014, Delery served as the 35th Assistant Attorney General for the Civil Division. After the resignation of Tony West, Delery served as acting Associate Attorney General from 2014 to 2016. Delery stepped down from his position in April 2016.

After leaving the Department of Justice, Delery  worked as a partner at Gibson, Dunn & Crutcher in Washington, D.C., where he specialized in white collar defense, constitutional law, and national security. He also maintained a pro bono practice, where he specialized in LGBT and immigration cases.

In July 2022, Delery became White House Counsel after the departure of Dana Remus. He is the first openly gay person to hold this role.

Personal life 
Delery is gay. Upon his nomination as associate attorney general in 2012, he became the highest-ranking openly-gay person serving in the United States Department of Justice.

See also 
 List of law clerks of the Supreme Court of the United States (Seat 6)
 List of law clerks of the Supreme Court of the United States (Seat 8)

References

External links

1968 births
Living people
20th-century American lawyers
21st-century American lawyers
Biden administration personnel
Law clerks of the Supreme Court of the United States
Obama administration personnel
People associated with Gibson Dunn
United States Associate Attorneys General
University of Virginia alumni
White House Counsels
Yale Law School alumni